The women's hammer throw competition at the 2016 Summer Olympics in Rio de Janeiro, Brazil. The event was held at the Olympic Stadium on 12–15 August. Each athlete received three throws in the qualifying round. All who achieved the qualifying distance progressed to the final. Each finalist was allowed three throws in last round, with the top eight athletes after that point being given three further attempts.

Summary
Anita Włodarczyk, the reigning World Champion and European Champion, was one of the stand-out gold medal favourites in the Olympic athletics programme, given that she held all ten of the best throws that year and a season's best of 80.26 m – the third best ever. The next best thrower that season was almost five metres behind on the rankings: Betty Heidler was the European runner-up. China's Zhang Wenxiu and Wang Zheng were the next highest ranked.

Włodarczyk continued her unbeaten streak since 2014 to top qualifying in 76.93 m. Zhang was second best in the round and Rosa Rodríguez of Venezuela was a surprise third automatic qualifier. The top ranked athletes progressed, though non threw beyond 72 metres. Hanna Skydan of Azerbaijan and American Gwen Berry were the most significant of the eliminated athletes.

In the final, Włodarczyk assumed the lead with her first throw of 76.35 m, ahead of Zhang's 75.06 m and Heidler holding bronze position with 71.38 m.  The second round saw Sophie Hitchon move into bronze position with a 73.29 m.  On the next throw, Włodarczyk improved her position with an 80.40 m, that nobody would match.  In the third round Zhang improved and so did Włodarczyk in a big way.  Her third throw was  a new world record.  Her mark improved upon her own previous world record by 1.21 m and was 2.87 m (over 9 feet) further than any other woman (Heidler) has ever thrown.  It was Włodarczyk's sixth world record and the fourth in succession since August 2014.  In the fourth round Zalina Marghieva moved into bronze position with her best throw of 73.50 m.  The fifth round saw Heidler edge back into bronze position with a 73.71 m, then Zhang solidified her silver position with her best throw of 76.75 m and Włodarczyk threw 81.74 m, only the second best throw in history to her third round throw.  On her final throw, Hitchon leapfrogged back into the bronze medal with a 74.54 m British National Record.

The medals were presented by Irena Szewińska, IOC member, Poland and Svein Arne Hansen, Council Member of the IAAF.

Schedule
All times are Brasília Time (UTC−3).

Records
, the existing World and Olympic records were as follows.

The following records were established during the competition:

The following national records were established during the competition:

Results

Qualification
Qualification rule: qualification standard 72.00 m (Q) or at least best 12 qualified (q).

Final

References

External links

Women's hammer throw
2016
2016 in women's athletics
Women's events at the 2016 Summer Olympics